Sanpete County is a county in the U.S. state of Utah. As of the 2010 United States Census, the population was 27,822. Its county seat is Manti, and its largest city is Ephraim. The county was created in 1850.

History
The Sanpete Valley may have been traversed or inhabited as long as 32,000 BP by small bands of hunters. This habitation may have continued for about 20,000 years when the extinction of larger game animals forced a change. About 8,500 years ago, different groups (characterized by use of atlatls, millstones and textiles) came onto the scene. These also departed the area about 2,500 years ago, for unknown reasons, after which the area does not seem to have been visited by humans for 1,500 years.

Archeological evidence indicates that the Fremont people appeared next on the stage (from about 1-1300 CE), the first inhabitants of the area to domesticate crops and create relatively large communal settlements. In this county, the best-known Fremont site to date is "Witch's Knoll" three miles (5 km) SE of Ephraim. Around 1300 AD the evidence of Fremont habitation also ceases. The most recent groups of indigenous Americans in the Sanpete region are the Ute, Paiute, Goshute, and Shoshoni, who appeared in Utah about 1300 and "perhaps they displaced, replaced, or assimilated the part-time Fremont hunter-gatherers." The Utes, Paiutes, Goshute and Shoshone share a common language family called Numic.

Mormon pioneers arrived in the Great Basin in the summer of 1847. The first few years were spent establishing a base in the Great Salt Lake Valley, then groups were sent, usually by the directive of the church leaders, to settle the more outlying areas. The chiefs, Walkara and Sowiette, asked Mormon leader Brigham Young to settle a group of his people in the valley of Sanpitch. Young sent a party to explore the area in August of that year. It was deemed favorable to settlement, and Brigham Young called Isaac Morley and George Washington Bradley to organize about fifty families to move south and settle "San Pete." The group of 224 arrived on 19 November, led by Isaac Morley, Charles Shumway, Seth Taft, and George Washington Bradley. After some debate, the first settlement in the valley was established on the present site of Manti, Utah.

The State of Deseret enacted the county effective January 31, 1850. The region was named for the Ute chief Sanpitch, which was changed to Sanpete. According to William Bright, the name comes from the Ute word saimpitsi, meaning "people of the tules".

The county boundaries were adjusted more than a dozen times during the 19th century. These adjustments often shrank it from its previous size. As of 1880, the county of Sanpete included the area of what would later become modern-day Carbon County, as well as some of Emery, Uintah, and Grand Counties. An adjustment in 1913 and refining of the county boundary definitions in 1919 brought Sanpete County to its present configuration. 

The Sanpete County Courthouse, completed in 1935 by the Works Project Administration, is on the National Register of Historic Places.

Geography
The Sanpete Valley runs from north to south through the center of the county. The county is sloped to the south, with its highest point east of Ephraim, on South Tent Mountain at 11,285' (3440m) ASL. The geographical center of Utah is located in Sanpete County, just west of Ephraim.

Sanpete County is bounded along its eastern side by the Wasatch Plateau (sometimes known as the Manti Mountains). The Wasatch Plateau rises to approximately 11,000 feet (3,300 m). Most of the Wasatch Plateau is encompassed by the Manti Division of the Manti-La Sal National Forest. Runoff from the western slopes of these mountains provides water to the county's cities and agricultural areas. Central Sanpete is dominated by the Sanpete Valley (sometimes known as the Sanpitch Valley), where most of the county's cities are located. The western side of the valley is bounded by the lower and drier San Pitch Mountains, which also form part of the western boundary of the county. The San Pitch River runs from north to south through Sanpete and empties into the Sevier River in southwestern Sanpete. This portion of the Sevier River Valley is known as Gunnison Valley.

Major highways

 United States Highway US-89
 Utah State Highway UT-28
 Utah State Highway UT-31
 Utah State Highway UT-116
 Utah State Highway UT-132
 Utah State Highway UT-137
 Utah State Highway UT-264

Adjacent counties

 Utah County - north
 Carbon County - northeast
 Emery County - east
 Sevier County  - south
 Millard County - southwest
 Juab County - northwest

Protected areas

 Bald Mountain Wildlife Management Area
 Fishlake National Forest (part)
 Hilltop Wildlife Management Area
 Manti-La Sal National Forest (part)
 Manti Wildlife Management Area
 Mayfield Face Wildlife Management Area
 Palisade State Park
 Spring City Wildlife Management Area
 Uinta-Wasatch-Cache National Forest (part)
 Yuba State Park

Lakes

 Academy Mill Reservoir
 Beaver Dam Reservoir (Benches Pond)
 Big Springs
 Blind Lake
 Blue Lake (near Grassy Lake)
 Blue Lake (near Henningson Reservoir)
 Blue Lake (near Wrigley Springs Reservoir)
 Boulger Reservoir
 Brush Reservoir
 Chester Ponds
 Commissary Spring
 Cottonwood Reservoir
 Cove Lake
 Deep Lake
 Dry Hole Reservoir
 Duck Fork Reservoir
 Emerald Lake
 Emery Reservoir
 Fairview Lakes
 Ferron Reservoir
 Grass Flat Reservoir
 Grassy Lake
 Gunnison Reservoir
 Hamburger Lake
 Harmonica Lake
 Hartney Lake
 Henningson Reservoir
 Huntington Reservoir
 Island Lake
 Jet Fox Reservoir
 John August Lake
 Johnson Springs
 Julius Flat Reservoir
 Little Madsen Reservoir
 Lizard Lake
 Loggers Fork Reservoir
 Lower Gooseberry Reservoir
 Madsen Lake
 Marys Lake
 McKinley Strates Reservoir
 Miller Flat Reservoir (part)
 New Canyon Reservoir
 Newfield Reservoir
 Ninemile Reservoir
 Olafs Pond
 Oleys Lakes
 Olsen Slough
 Palisade Lake
 Patton Reservoir
 Petes Hole Reservoir
 Petes Reservoir
 Rolfson Reservoir
 Rush Pond
 Sevier Bridge Reservoir (Yuba Lake) (part)
 Slide Lake
 Sixmile Ponds
 Lower Pond
 Upper Pond
 Snow Lake
 Soup Bowl
 Spinners Reservoir
 Crooked Creek Spring
 Three Lakes (one of the three)
 Town Reservoir
 Twin Lake
 Wales Reservoir
 Willow Lake
 Woods Lake
 WPA Ponds
 Wrigley Springs Reservoir (part)
 Yearns Reservoir

Demographics

2000 census
As of the 2000 United States Census, there were 22,763 people, 6,547 households, and 5,067 families in the county. The population density was 14.3/sqmi (5.53/km2). There were 7,879 housing units at an average density of 4.96/sqmi (1.91/km2). The racial makeup of the county was 92.43% White, 0.31% Black or African American, 0.87% Native American, 0.48% Asian, 0.36% Pacific Islander, 4.06% from other races, and 1.49% from two or more races. 6.63% of the population were Hispanic or Latino of any race.

In 2005 Sanpete County had a population that was 88.7% non-Hispanic whites. African Americans constituted 0.5% of the population. Native Americans were 1.0% of the population. Asians were 0.8% of the population. Pacific Islanders were growing faster in numbers than Asians and were tied with Asians at 0.8%. 8.1% of the population was now Latino.

There were 6,547 households, of which 43.40% had children under 18 living with them, 67.00% were married couples living together, 7.20% had a female householder with no husband present, and 22.60% were non-families. 17.80% of all households were made up of individuals, and 10.10% had someone living alone who was 65 years of age or older. The average household size was 3.27, and the average family size was 3.68.

The county population contained 33.20% under 18, 16.40% from 18 to 24, 21.80% from 25 to 44, 17.80% from 45 to 64, and 10.80% who were 65 years of age or older. The median age was 25 years. For every 100 females, there were 102.40 males. For every 100 females aged 18 and over, there were 100.90 males.

The median income for a household in the county was $33,042, and the median income for a family was $37,796. Males had a median income of $30,527 versus $19,974 for females. The per capita income for the county was $12,442.  About 10.40% of families and 15.90% of the population were below the poverty line, including 13.90% of those under age 18 and 9.60% of those aged 65 or over.

Economy

Sanpete County is a largely agricultural region of the state, dotted with rural farming towns. Agriculture, livestock, small businesses, government employment, and Snow College form the economic backbone of the county.

A significant industry in the county is turkey ranching and the Moroni Feed Company, a turkey producing and processing cooperative. Moroni Feed Company is a part owner of the marketing cooperative Norbest . Moroni Feed Company operates several divisions throughout the county, including a turkey processing plant, hatchery, feed mill, propane store, and sales office located in and near the town of Moroni. The company employs over 600 people throughout the state, with the corporate headquarters located near Moroni. Numerous turkey barns and sheds dot the landscape, primarily around Moroni and the other northern Sanpete towns.

Alfalfa fields and other animal feed crops make up the bulk of the agricultural activity and economy of the county.

Communities

Cities

 Centerfield
 Ephraim
 Fairview
 Fountain Green
 Gunnison
 Manti (county seat)
 Moroni
 Mount Pleasant
 Spring City

Towns

 Fayette
 Mayfield
 Sterling
 Wales

Unincorporated communities

 Axtell
 Chester
 Christianburg
 Dover
 Freedom
 Indianola
 Jerusalem
 Milburn
 Oak Creek
 Spearmint

Ghost towns
 Clarion
 Manasseh

Politics and Government
Sanpete County has traditionally voted Republican. In no national election since 1936 has the county selected the Democratic Party candidate (as of 2020).

See also
 National Register of Historic Places listings in Sanpete County, Utah
 Sanpits Tribe

External links
 Sanpete County Official Website
Sanpete Life: Resource for events and activities

References

 
1850 establishments in Utah Territory
Populated places established in 1850